In enzymology, an UDP-N-acetylglucosamine 2-epimerase is an enzyme that catalyzes the chemical reaction

UDP-N-acetyl-D-glucosamine  UDP-N-acetyl-D-mannosamine

Hence, this enzyme has one substrate, UDP-N-acetyl-D-glucosamine, and one product, UDP-N-acetyl-D-mannosamine.

This enzyme belongs to the family of isomerases, specifically those racemases and epimerases acting on carbohydrates and derivatives.  The systematic name of this enzyme class is UDP-N-acetyl-D-glucosamine 2-epimerase. Other names in common use include UDP-N-acetylglucosamine 2'-epimerase, uridine diphosphoacetylglucosamine 2'-epimerase, uridine diphospho-N-acetylglucosamine 2'-epimerase, and uridine diphosphate-N-acetylglucosamine-2'-epimerase.  This enzyme participates in aminosugars metabolism.

In microorganisms this epimerase is involved in the synthesis of the capsule precursor UDP-ManNAcA. An inhibitor of the bacterial 2-epimerase, epimerox, has been described.  Some of these enzymes are bifunctional.  The UDP-N-acetylglucosamine 2-epimerase from rat liver displays both epimerase and kinase activity.

Structural studies

References

Further reading
 

Protein families
EC 5.1.3
Enzymes of known structure